Eachus is a personal name. People with that name include:

 Nate Eachus (born 1990), American football player
 Todd A. Eachus (born 1962), U.S. politician in Pennsylvania
 Robert E. Doan (Robert Eachus Doan, 1831-1919), U.S. Representative from Ohio
 Vernon Dow Eachus (Known as "Mike" Eachus, born 1900 Parsons Kansas) Road Construction owner Las Vegas NV
 Ruth Eachus Mills (born 1939) Daughter of Vernon Dow Eachus

See also